Velike Poljane is a village in the Municipality of Škocjan in southeastern Slovenia (the traditional region of Lower Carniola). Within the municipality, it belongs to the Village Community of Zagrad. The municipality is now included in the Southeast Slovenia Statistical Region. 

The local church is dedicated to Saint Thomas and belongs to the Parish of Škocjan. It is a medieval building that was restyled in the Baroque style in 1731.

References

External links
Velike Poljane at Geopedia

Populated places in the Municipality of Škocjan